This page gathers the results of elections in Marche.

Regional elections

Latest regional election

In the latest regional election, which took place on 20–21 September 2020, Francesco Acquaroli of the Brothers of Italy (FdI) was elected president, giving to the centre-right coalition its first victory in the region.

List of previous regional elections
1970 Marche regional election
1975 Marche regional election
1980 Marche regional election
1985 Marche regional election
1990 Marche regional election
1995 Marche regional election
2000 Marche regional election
2005 Marche regional election
2010 Marche regional election
2015 Marche regional election

 
Politics of le Marche